Taylor–Cope Historic District is a national historic district located in West Bradford Township, Chester County, Pennsylvania. It encompasses 15 contributing buildings, including the separately listed Taylor House, and 1 contributing structure in rural Chester County. They are primarily residential buildings and barns built between 1724 and 1906. The oldest building is the English Colonial style Abiah Taylor House constructed in 1724. The contributing structure is the separately listed Cope's Bridge.

It was added to the National Register of Historic Places in 1987.

References

Historic districts on the National Register of Historic Places in Pennsylvania
Historic districts in Chester County, Pennsylvania
National Register of Historic Places in Chester County, Pennsylvania